Toxique are a Czech musical group performing electronic pop music.

History
The group was founded by five graduates from Prague's Institute of Chemical Technology in early 2007, and the same year they played their first live show. Toxique's debut single, "Two Sides", took part in national selection for Czech's entry in the Eurovision Song Contest 2008. Although it didn't make it to the semi-finals, it became a considerable hit, reaching no. 35 in Czech national airplay chart Rádio Top 100. Their debut album, eponymously titled Toxique, was released in 2008 and peaked at no. 32 in the Czech Republic.

In 2009, they released singles "Honey" and "eBay", which did not match the success of their debut song. 2010 saw the release of their second album, Outlet People, preceded by the single "Shout" which made it to no. 52 in Rádio Top 100. The album itself proved to be more successful, debuting at no. 26 and meeting with favourable reviews. In November, the band toured the UK with Polish singer Kayah as part of O2's Your Country live concert series.

Toxique released their third album, Tips for Grown Up Kids, in 2012, promoted by the single "Toxique Girls", featuring Czech-Polish singer Ewa Farna. The song garnered considerable popularity, however, the album failed to chart. In 2013, the band's lead vocalist Klára Vytisková embarked on a solo career and released singles "Country Girl" and "Survival".

Band members
 Klára Vytisková – vocals
 Patrick Karpentski – guitar
 Viliam Béreš – keyboard
 Jan Lstibůrek – bass guitar
 Roman Vícha – drums

Discography

Albums
 2008: Toxique
 2010: Outlet People
 2012: Tips for Grown Up Kids

Singles
 2008: "Two Sides"
 2009: "Honey"
 2009: "eBay"
 2010: "Shout"
 2011: "Field Lines"
 2012: "Toxique Girls" (feat. Ewa Farna)
 2012: "Turn Me On"

Awards and nominations

References

External links

Toxique at Facebook
Toxique at Twitter
Toxique at YouTube

Czech electronic music groups
Czech pop music groups
Musical groups established in 2007
2007 establishments in the Czech Republic